Le Gardeur may refer to:

Persons 
 Pierre Legardeur de Repentigny (admiral), sieur of Repentigny, born in 1600 in Thury-Harcourt in Normandy and died in 1648, is general of the fleet and director of embarkations for New France.
 Jean-Paul Le Gardeur, sieur de Repentigny, born in Ville-Marie on 4 October 1661 and died in 1738, was an explorer and soldier of New France, serving of the King of France.
 Jacques Legardeur de Saint-Pierre (21 October 1701 — 8 September 1755) is a military officer who took part in various expeditions in North America on behalf of the King of France.
 Augustin le Gardeur de Courtemanche born on 16 December 1663 in the city of Quebec and died on 29 June 1717 in Labrador, is a commander from the Labrador coast and ambassador from New France.
 Armand Le Gardeur de Tilly, born in Rochefort on 14 January 1733 and died at Domaine de La Salle in Champagne, on 1 January 1812, was a French amiral.

Place names

Canada 
 Le Gardeur (township), Côte-Nord-du-Golfe-du-Saint-Laurent (Municipality), MRC Le Golfe-du-Saint-Laurent Regional County Municipality, Côte-Nord, Quebec
 Le Gardeur, Quebec, a sector of Repentigny (City), MRC L'Assomption Regional County Municipality, Lanaudière, Quebec
 Lac Le Gardeur (Nord-du-Québec), Eeyou Istchee Baie-James (municipality) (Municipality), Nord-du-Quebec, Quebec
 Le Gardeur Lake (Lac-Croche), Lac-Croche (Unorganized territory), MRC La Jacques-Cartier Regional County Municipality, Capitale-Nationale, Quebec
 Parc Le Gardeur, public park of Repentigny (City), MRC L'Assomption Regional County Municipality, Lanaudière, Quebec.
 Le Gardeur Bridge, Montreal (City) Park, Quebec